Đắk Mil is a rural district of Đắk Nông province in the Central Highlands region of Vietnam. As of 2003 the district had a population of 74,708. The district covers an area of 684 km². The district capital lies at Đăk Mil. The ethnic composition of Đăk Mil is quite diversified: there are 19 ethnic groups. Vietnamese people represent 14,314 households / 64,474 people, accounting for 80% of the district, while ethnic minorities number 1,346 households / 7,135 people. 8.6% of the total population are from the M'Nong ethnic minority. The small Ede (4 households / 31 people) and Mạ (1 household) groups are also present. A total of 2,037 households / 9,400 people are ethnic minorities.

References

Districts of Đắk Nông province